Bokakhat subdivision is a subdivision situated in the Golaghat district of Assam.

External links

Golaghat district